Luis Alfonso "El Bendito" Fajardo Posada (born 18 June 1963) is a retired Colombian footballer. He was chosen to play for Colombia in the 1990 FIFA World Cup in Italy by his former Atlético Nacional manager Francisco Maturana. He's now a chairman of Deportivo Rionegro, a second division Colombian team.

Career
Fajardo played club football for Atlético Nacional, Independiente Medellín and Envigado Fútbol Club before retiring in 1996. He won the Colombian league with Nacional in 1991.

References

External links

1963 births
Living people
Colombian footballers
Colombia international footballers
1990 FIFA World Cup players
Categoría Primera A players
Atlético Nacional footballers
Independiente Medellín footballers
Envigado F.C. players
Association football midfielders
Footballers from Medellín